James Alexander Dinwiddie (February 8, 1855 – March 14, 1940) was an American politician who served as a member of the Virginia Senate.

References

External links
 

1855 births
1940 deaths
Republican Party Virginia state senators
19th-century American politicians
20th-century American politicians